Dunkirk is a 2017 epic war film directed Christopher Nolan. The film depicts the Dunkirk evacuation of World War II through the perspectives of the land, sea, and air. Its ensemble cast includes Fionn Whitehead, Tom Glynn-Carney, Jack Lowden, Harry Styles, Aneurin Barnard, James D'Arcy, Barry Keoghan, Kenneth Branagh, Cillian Murphy, Mark Rylance and Tom Hardy. Noland wrote the screenplay and produced the film with wife Emma Thomas. Hans Zimmer composed the film's score, and Lee Smith was the film editor. Alex Gibson, Richard King, Gregg Landaker, Gary A. Rizzo, and Mark Weingarten were responsible for the sound effects. The film premiered at Odeon Leicester Square in London on 13 July 2017. Warner Bros. later gave the film a wide release on 21 July at over 11,000 cinemas internationally including over 3,700 in the United States and Canada and over 600 in the United Kingdom. Dunkirk grossed $525million on a $100million budget. Rotten Tomatoes, a review aggregator, surveyed 461 reviews and judged 92 percent to be positive.

Dunkirk garnered many awards and nominations in a variety of categories with particular praise for Nolan's direction as well as its visual effects, cinematography, sound effects, and film editing. The film received eight nominations at the 90th Academy Awards including Best Picture and Best Director for Nolan, his first Academy Award nomination in that category. It went on to win three awards for Best Film Editing, Best Sound Editing, and Best Sound Mixing. It earned eight nominations at the 71st British Academy Film Awards and won for Best Sound. Dunkirk received three nominations at the 75th Golden Globe Awards for Best Motion Picture – Drama, Best Director, and Best Original Score for Zimmer. The film was nominated for Best Theatrical Motion Picture at the 29th Producers Guild of America Awards; Nolan received a nomination for Outstanding Directing – Feature Film at the 70th Directors Guild of America Awards. Both the American Film Institute and National Board of Review included the film in their lists of the top ten of the year.

Accolades

See also

 2017 in film

Notes

References

External links 
 

Lists of accolades by film